Doug Eisenman (born October 2, 1968) is a former professional tennis player from the United States.

Biography
Eisenman, a doubles specialist, comes from Santa Ana, California. He attended Foothill High School, where in 1986 he was Los Angeles Times First Team All-County.

He teamed up with Dan Turbow to win the doubles title at the 1986 National Junior Hardcourts Championships. Between 1987 and 1990 he attended UC Berkeley. He won the NCAA Division I doubles title with Matt Lucena in 1990, along with the Collegiate Championships and National Indoor Championships.

He competed in the 1989 Maccabiah Games in Israel.

In 1990, after graduation, Eisenman turned professional and competed on the Challenger and ATP Tour circuits. He made the semi-finals at São Paulo in 1992 with Royce Deppe and further semi-finals in both Prague and Umag in 1993, with Donald Johnson. All three of his Challenger titles came in 1992. At Grand Slam level he featured in the men's doubles draws at the Australian Open, Wimbledon and US Open. He reached the second round of the 1992 Wimbledon Championships with Mark Knowles. His best performance came at the 1993 US Open. As wildcards, Eisenman and partner Donald Johnson made the third round, a run which included a win over eighth seeds Sergio Casal and Emilio Sánchez.

Challenger titles

Doubles: (3)

References

External links
 
 

1968 births
Living people
American male tennis players
Tennis players from Los Angeles
California Golden Bears men's tennis players
Maccabiah Games competitors for the United States
Competitors at the 1989 Maccabiah Games
Maccabiah Games tennis players
Sportspeople from Santa Ana, California